Ingrid García-Jonsson (born 6 September 1991) is a Spanish actress born in Sweden.

Biography
García-Jonsson studied architecture, and first worked as a waitress in a bar. She got her first role in the film Hermosa juventud, which premiered at the Festival de Cannes and received good reviews.

García-Jonsson became well-known as an actress in independent films, and was nominated to Premios Feroz, Premios Forqué, Gaudí Awards, and Premios Goya.

In the film Knight and Day (2010), García-Jonsson was the stuntwoman for Cameron Diaz.

García-Jonsson played Amalia along Carlos Areces and Oscar Martínez in Yo, mi mujer y mi mujer muerta (2019), directed by Santiago Amodeo. She played Nathalie along Maggie Civantos, Jon Plazaola and Secun de la Rosa in La pequeña Suiza. She played Eva alongside Verónica Forqué, Rosa Maria Sardà and David Verdaguerin in Salir del ropero, by Ángeles Reiné.

In October 2020 she began shooting the Álex de la Iglesia's movie Veneciafrenia with Cosimo Fusco, Silvia Alonso and Caterina Murino. In July  of the same year its announced her involvement in the movie Camara Cafe: La pelicula

In November 2021 was release the second Season of Audiofiction Show Biotopia were she played Elena one of the Main cast

Filmography

Films

TV series

References

External links
 
 
 

1987 births
Living people
20th-century Swedish actresses
21st-century Swedish actresses
Swedish television actresses
Swedish film actresses
20th-century Spanish actresses
21st-century Spanish actresses
Spanish television actresses
Spanish film actresses